Hollywood is the name of the graphics processing unit (GPU) used in Nintendo's Wii video game console. It was designed by ATI (now AMD), and is manufactured using the same 90 nm or 65 nm (depending on the hardware revision) CMOS process as Broadway, the Wii's central processing unit. Very few official details about Hollywood were released to the public by Nintendo, ATI, or any other company involved in the Wii's development. The Hollywood GPU is reportedly based on the GameCube's Flipper GPU and is clocked 50% higher at 243 MHz, though these clock rates have never been officially confirmed.

Hollywood is a multi-chip module (MCM) package containing three dies under the cover in the Hollywood-A revision. The first of these three dies, codenamed Napa, controls the I/O functions, RAM access, the Audio DSP, and the actual GPU with its embedded DRAM, and measures 8 × 9 mm. The other, codenamed Vegas, holds 24 MB of "internal" 1T-SRAM and measures 13.5 × 7 mm. A third, tiny die contains EEPROM. The Hollywood-1 revision was fabricated on a 65 nm node and merges Napa and Vegas into a single die, resulting in a two-die MCM.

Hardware capabilities 
 243 MHz graphics chip
 3MB embedded GPU memory (eDRAM)
 2MB dedicated to Z-buffer and framebuffer
 1MB texture cache
 24MB 1T-SRAM @ 486 MHz (3.9GB/s) directly accessible for textures and other video data
 Fixed function pipeline (no support for programmable vertex or pixel shaders in hardware)
 Texture Environment Unit (TEV) - capable of combining up to 8 textures in up to 16 stages or "passes"
 ~30GB/s internal bandwidth^
 ~18 million polygons/second^
 972Mpixels/sec peak pixel fillrate

Note: ^ denotes speculation: using confirmed AMD GameCube data x 1.5, a crude but likely accurate way of calculating the Wii's results based on clock speeds and identical architecture.

Texture Environment Unit 
The Texture Environment Unit (TEV) is a unique piece of hardware exclusive to the GameCube and Wii. The Wii inherited the TEV from Flipper, and the TEV is—to use an analogy from Factor 5 director Julian Eggebrecht—"like an elaborate switchboard that makes the wildest combinations of textures and materials possible."

The TEV pipeline combines up to 8 textures in up to 16 stages at once. Each stage can apply a multitude of functions to the texture. This was frequently used to simulate pixel shader effects such as bump-mapping, or to perform effects such as cel shading. On the GameCube, Factor 5's Star Wars: Rogue Squadron II used the TEV for the targeting computer effect and the simulated volumetric fog. In another scenario, Wave Race: Blue Storm used the TEV notably for water distortion (such as refraction) and other water effects. The Wii's TEV unit and TEV capabilities are no different from the GameCube's, excluding indirect performance advantages from the faster clock speeds.

Starlet 
Hollywood contains an ARM926EJ-S core, which has been unofficially nicknamed Starlet. This embedded microprocessor runs an undocumented operating system called IOS and performs many of the Wii's I/O functions, including controlling the wireless functionality, USB, the SD card interface, the optical disc drive, the internal NAND flash storage, WiiConnect24 when the console is in standby mode, and other miscellaneous functions. The Starlet acts as the security controller of the console, performing various cryptography functions; Starlet is designed to remain secure even if the Broadway is compromised. Hollywood includes hardware implementations of AES and SHA-1 to speed up Starlet's security functionality. Communication between the Starlet and the Broadway is accomplished via an IPC mechanism. Starlet has complete control over Broadway; the former can reboot the latter and supply it with code to execute at any time.

References

Graphics processing units
Nintendo chips
ATI Technologies products
Wii hardware